Yılmaz Onay (20 April 1937 – 9 January 2018) was a Turkish author, theatre director and translator.

He translated plays, which most of them are known plays of Bertolt Brecht, stories, novels, books of poems and non-fiction books from German to Turkish and write plays and novels; all published. As a director, he staged most of Brecht's works, in a theatre called Epic Theatre which he was one of the frontiers of this theatre movement in Turkey.
Onay's first accomplishment as director was, staging a known play Fear and Misery of the Third Reich written by Brecht.

Biography

Yılmaz Onay was born in 1937 in Gaziantep. In 1960 he finished his study as a structural engineer at the Istanbul Technical University (İTÜ.) While studying, he was also part of the theatre group called ITÜ theatre. In 1961 he received grants from The German Academic Exchange Service (DAAD) to participate in a research program at the Karlsruhe Institute of Technology, in Germany, which he had the opportunity to form a theatre group consisted of young actors from Germany, Turkey and Egypt, as well as an American soldier. He produced his first piece, The Rulers, the work of Eugène Ionesco, within the scope of the ‘’Duisburger Society Ensemble.’’ A year later, Onay was back to Ankara where he worked with the Cinema and Theatre Association, and the ‘’Ankara Experimental Stage’’, until 1972.

He was awarded with International Peace Party 2nd prize in Istanbul, in 1965, for the work, War Game, which he staged and produced. The piece was adapted from a radio play, Such a Piece, written by Sermet Çagan.

In 1966, Onay shared the "Grand Prix of the Festival Mondial du Theatre de Nancy" with a Brazilian theater troop, for the piece Long Creek, which was adapted from Yaşar Kemal’s novel, Yer Demir, Gök Bakır (Iron Earth, Copper Sky) by Nihat Asyalı.

He took a role in a play, Reading Passage, directed by Max Meinecke. This play was staged at the Goethe Institut in Ankara.
The first play he directed, in Ankara Art Theatre (AST,) was Fear and Misery of The Third Empire of Bertolt Brecht, in 1972. In 1973, he was invited by the ITI, (German Centre of the International Theatre Institute,) as a guest student to participate on the urban stages of the city of Essen and Berlin. In 1974, he helped start a new theatre called The Contemporary Stage, in Ankara, where he, from 1975 to 1978, produced and directed plays, adapted from Nazım Hikmet’s Yusuf and Menofis, Nihat Asyalı's Strike, and Gladkov's The Cement. Later in 1984, he directed a play, adapted from a novel by Hans Fallada, called Little Man, What Now?, and a self-written cabaret These Price Raises Are Up Against Me. From 1985 to 1989 he produced and directed his own pieces abroad, Those Who Were Left in Araf and Mystery of Karagöz in Amsterdam, The Death of An Artist in Paris, a play about peace for children, Our Songs Must Not Die, in the Hebbel Theater, Berlin. While in Berlin, he staged and directed a play of  Dario Fo, Non Si Paga! Non Si Paga! (We Won't Pay! We Won't Pay!) in 1991. Onay, in the same year, moved to Istanbul, and in 1993 he was appointed as stage director at the Istanbul National Theatre, where he produced and directed numerous plays, including his own. Onay retired from his post in 2002. In 2006, one of his works, The death of an Artist was adapted for a television play by TRT. His other stage plays were performed in Turkey and in different countries several times. In addition, he has published in different newspapers and magazines numerous articles and has taken part in many panel discussions. On 14 April 2008 it was celebrated Yılmaz Onay 50 years in art.

Works

Translations  from  the  German

Stage plays 
 An Enemy of the People,  Henrik Ibsen – Bir Halk Düşmanı
 Mariena Pineda, Federico Garcia Lorca – Mariena Pineda
 Process Richard Waverly,  R.Schneider  – Richard Waverly Davası
 The Last Ones,  Maxim Gorky – Sonuncular
 The Brecht's Act,  George Tabori – Brecht Dosyası
 The Trojan Women,  Euripides – Troyalı Kadınlar
 Electra,  Euripides  – Elektra
 The Bible,  Bertolt Brecht – İncil
 Baal,  B.Brecht – Baal
 Drums in the Night,  B.Brecht – Gecede Trampet Sesleri
 The Wedding,  B.Brecht – Düğün
 The Beggar,  B.Brecht – Dilenci veya Ölü Köpek
 Driving Out a Devil,  B.Brecht – Şeytan Kovma
 Lux in Tenebris,  B.Brecht – Karanlıkta Işık
 The Catch,  B.Brecht – Balık Avı
 The Plain,  B.Brecht – Ova
 In the Jungle,  B.Brecht – Vahşi Ormanda
 In the Jungle of Cities,  B.Brecht – Kentlerin Vahşi Ormanında
 Man Equals Man 1926,  B.Brecht – Adam Adamdır  1926
 Man Equals Man 1938,  B.Brecht – Adam Adamdır  1938
 Saint Joan of the Stockyards,  B.Brecht – Mezbahaların Kutsal Johanna'sı
 The Seven Deadly Sins,  B.Brecht – Küçük Burjuvanın Yedi Ölümcül Günahı
 The Horatians and the Curiatians,  B.Brecht – Horasyalılar Kuriasyalılar
 Señora Carrar's Rifles,  B.Brecht – Carrar Ananın Silahları
 Fear and Misery of the Third Reich,  B.Brecht – III.Reich' ın Korku ve Sefaleti
 Mr Puntila and his Man Matti,  B.Brecht – Puntila Ağa ile Uşağı Matti
 The Caucasian Chalk Circle,  B.Brecht – Kafkas Tebeşir Dairesi
 Round Heads and Pointed Heads,  B.Brecht – Sivri Kafalılar ve Yuvarlak Kafalılar / Yuvarlak Kafalılar ve Sivri Kafalılar

Stories 
 The Stories  Anna Seghers, Anna Seghers – Öyküler

Novels 
 Living, Glimmering, Lying, Botho Strauß – Evlerde Uyur Uyanık Yalanlar

Lyric  
  Svendborg's Poems, Bertolt Brecht – Svendborg  Şiirleri
  Steffin's Collection, Bertolt Brecht – Steffin Derlemeleri
  Hollywood Elegies, Bertolt Brecht – Hollywood Elejileri
  Poems in Exile, Bertolt Brecht – Sürgün Şiirleri
  War Primer, Bertolt Brecht – Savaş El Kitabı
  German Satires (2nd part), Bertolt Brecht – Alman Taşlamaları (İkinci bölüm)
  Children's Songs, Bertolt Brecht – Çocuk Şarkıları
  New Children's Songs, Bertolt Brecht – Yeni Çocuk Şarkıları
  Buckow Elegies, Bertolt Brecht – Buckow Elejileri
  The Messingkauf Dialogues, Bertolt Brecht – Bakır Alımı

Non-fiction books  
  Agitprop  Troops,  A.Kammrad  –  F.R.Scheck  –  İşçi Tiyatroları – Ajitprop Topluluklar
  Worksjournal,  B.Brecht  –  Brecht'le Yaşamak  –  Çalışma Günlüğü
  The Epic  theatre,  Marianne Kesting  –  Epik Tiyatro
  Literatur Science, an Introduction, G.N.Pospelov  –  Edebiyat Bilimi
  West and Not Forget,  Daniela Dahn –  Batı Diye Diye
  Theatrical Work,  Berliner  Ensemble  –  Tiyatro Çalışması
  An Introduction To The Greek Tragedy,  Joachim Latacz  –  Antik  Yunan Tragedyaları

Own works

Stage plays 
Tren Gidiyor – The Train Goes
Bu Zamlar Bana Karşı – These Price Raises Are Up Against Me
Dev Masalı – The Dragon's Fairy Tale
Sevdalı Bulut – The Cloud In Love – adapted from Nazım Hikmet's story
Şarkılarımız Ölmesin – Our Songs Must Not Die
Küçük Adam N'oldu Sana? – Little Man, What Now? – adapted from Hans Fallada's novel
Sanatçının Ölümü – The Death Of An Artist
Arafta Kalanlar – Those, Who Were Left in Purgatory
Karagözün Muamması – Mystery Of Karagöz
Karadul Efsanesi – The Legend Of Black Widow
Hücre İnsanı – Homo Zellicus
Prometheia – Prometheia
Karakedi Geçti – The Black Ran Through The Way

Novels 
Yazılar FİLMATİK – Footnote FİLMATİK
Oyun Değil – No Play

Non-fiction books 
Gerçekçilik Yeniden – Realism Again!

External links 

Publisher Mitos Boyut

References

1937 births
2018 deaths
People from Gaziantep
Turkish dramatists and playwrights
Turkish novelists
Istanbul Technical University alumni